Silent Witness is a British television drama. The following is a list of all episodes that have been broadcast across all television series, since the series began on 21 February 1996. The first seven series featured Amanda Burton in the lead role. Following Burton's departure (in series 8, episode 2), Emilia Fox joined the show (in series 8, episode 5) as new forensic pathologist Nikki Alexander and as of 2022 is still in the series. In the first episode of series 6, William Gaminara and Tom Ward both joined the series. After series 15, Ward left the show to pursue other projects. He was replaced by David Caves and Liz Carr who both joined the show in series 16.
Gaminara left the show at the end of series 16 and was replaced by Richard Lintern from series 17. Both Lintern and Carr left the show at the end of series 23.

The series has been released on BBC DVD since July 2006, usually with two series being released together in one box set. This practice has stopped and series 17 onwards have been released as single DVDs (as was the case for series 1 and 2). Silent Witness stories usually consist of two episodes to one story, with each part lasting 60 minutes, while series 25 is one story in six 1-hour episodes

Series overview

Episodes

Series 1 (1996)

Series 2 (1997)

Series 3 (1998)

Series 4 (1999)

Series 5 (2000–01)

Series 6 (2002)
Series 6 was confirmed in April 2001. This series saw the introduction of two new main characters, Professor Leo Dalton and Dr. Harry Cunningham, portrayed by William Gaminara and Tom Ward respectively.

Series 7 (2003)

Series 8 (2004)
Series 8 was confirmed alongside series 7. This series saw the departure of Amanda Burton as Dr. Sam Ryan and the introduction of new character Dr. Nikki Alexander, portrayed by Emilia Fox.

Series 9 (2005)

Series 10 (2006)

Series 11 (2007)

Series 12 (2008)

Series 13 (2010)

Series 14 (2011)

Series 15 (2012)
Series 15 was confirmed in April 2011. It is the last to star Tom Ward, as Dr Harry Cunningham
NOTE that this list is in order of first broadcast by the BBC. The BBC postponed the first broadcast of episode And Then I Fell in Love for "editorial reasons" shortly before its intended broadcast and brought forward Domestic in its place, eventually showing And Then I Fell in Love four months later (after it had been shown in Australia).
The originally intended order of episodes now used by the BBC on iPlayer, by other broadcasters, and by IMDb is:
Death Has No Dominion, And Then I Fell in Love, Paradise Lost, Domestic, Redhill, Fear.

 Episodes originally in swapped places.

Series 16 (2013)
It was confirmed during the shooting of series 15 that Silent Witness would return for a 16th series in January 2013. It is the final series to star William Gaminara, as Professor Leo Dalton. This series sees the introduction of new main characters Jack Hodgson and technician Clarissa, portrayed by David Caves and Liz Carr respectively.

Series 17 (2014)
After the last episode of series 16, it was confirmed that Silent Witness would return for a 17th series in early 2014. Emilia Fox, David Caves and Liz Carr returned for the series, which started filming in April 2013. In the new series Richard Lintern would play new forensic pathologist Dr Thomas Chamberlain. Some scenes were filmed at Charlton Athletic's last game of the 2012–13 season at The Valley and again on 15 May. Filming also took place in Dundee and on the Tay Road Bridge.

Series 18 (2015) 
Emilia Fox confirmed on Twitter that production on the 18th series was underway, and that it should air in 2015.

Series 19 (2016)

Series 20 (2017)

Series 21 (2018)

Series 22 (2019)

Series 23 (2020)

Series 24 (2021)

Series 25 (2022) 
After the series 24 finale, a trailer was shown on BBC1 announcing that Amanda Burton would be reprising her role as Sam Ryan in series 25, consisting of six episodes starting on 23 May 2022. Unlike the previous series’, the twenty fifth series features one story spread over six parts.

Series 26 (2023)

References

Silent Witness
Silent Witness